La Grange is a town in Fayette County, Tennessee, United States. The population was 133 at the 2010 census. A large area in the town is listed on the National Register of Historic Places as La Grange Historic District.

Geography
La Grange is located in southeastern Fayette County at  (35.045629, -89.234349).

Tennessee State Route 57 passes through the town, leading east  to Grand Junction and west  to Moscow.

Demographics

According to the 2000 census, there were 136 people, 59 households, and 45 families residing in the town. The population density was 85.5 people per square mile (33.0 per square km). The racial makeup of the town was 83.09% White, 12.50% African American, 0.74% Native American, 2.21% Asian, and 1.47% from two or more races. Hispanic or Latino of any race were 2.94% of the population.

There were 59 households, out of which 18.6% had children under the age of 18 living with them, 66.1% were married couples living together, 8.5% had a female householder with no husband present, and 23.7% were non-families. 23.7% of all households were made up of individuals, and 6.8% had someone living alone who was 65 years of age or older. The average household size was 2.31 and the average family size was 2.71.

In the town, the population was spread out, with 18.4% under the age of 18, 1.5% from 18 to 24, 22.1% from 25 to 44, 38.2% from 45 to 64, and 19.9% who were 65 years of age or older. The median age was 48 years. For every 100 females, there were 97.1 males. For every 100 females age 18 and over, there were 91.4 males.

The median income for a household in the town was $53,214, and the median income for a family was $63,333. Males had a median income of $36,875 versus $16,875 for females. The per capita income for the town was $38,626. There were 2.2% of families and 4.4% of the population living below the poverty line, including 3.2% of under eighteens and 8.3% of those over 64.

Notable people
 La Tonya Johnson, Wisconsin state legislator
 Lucy Pickens, socialite "Queen of the Confederacy" born at a nearby plantation
 Daniel D. Stevens, Union Navy sailor and Medal of Honor recipient
 Franklin Cossitt, founder of La Grange, Illinois

References

External links
Town of La Grange official website

Gallery

Towns in Fayette County, Tennessee
Towns in Tennessee
Memphis metropolitan area